Miguel Ali Berdiel (born December 27, 1983) is a Puerto Rican professional basketball player who currently plays for Gigantes de Carolina.  Berdiel has played in the NCAA, CBA, the NBA G League, and the Baloncesto Superior Nacional (BSN). Internationally, Berdiel has played in Belgium, Slovenia, Cyprus, Mexico and Uruguay.  Berdiel was a member of the Puerto Rico national basketball team from 2007 until 2014.

Brief biography
Berdiel played his college career with Valparaiso from 2001–2006.  During his college career he earned the Second Team All-Mid-Continent.

Berdiel has played professionally in the National Superior Basketball League of Puerto Rico since 1999.

During the 2006–2007 season, Berdiel played with the Utah Eagles of the Continental Basketball Association (CBA).  Berdiel also played internationally in Belgium.

On 11 June 2007, Berdiel signed a contract with the New York Knicks of the NBA to participate in the 2007 Summer League.  The Knicks had shown interest in Berdiel during the 2006–2007 season having offering him a 10-Day contract in which he was not released by the Dexia-Mons Hainaut of the Belgium league and could not accept the offer.

During the summer of 2007, Berdiel participated in the Las Vegas Summer Pro League with the New York Knicks.  After playing in the Summer Pro League he continued to Brazil for the 2007 Pan-American Games as a member of the Puerto Rican National Basketball Team winning the Silver Medal.

On 1 Nov 2007, Berdiel was drafted for a second season in row in the NBDL Draft.  He was chosen by the Albuquerque Thunderbirds with the 12th pick in the sixth round. On May 21, 2008 the Indiana Pacers invited Berdiel to participate with the team in the NBA's summer rookie league.

Playing Style 
Berdiel is known for his playmaking and defensive prowess. At 6'6", he is an exceptionally-large point guard who can see over defenses and get in the passing lanes when defending. Twice he led the BSN in steals, earning all-defensive team honors.

Career stats
Berdiel's NCAA stats in 124 games are 981 points with a 7.9 PPG, 507 assists with a 4.1 APG, 340 rebounds with a 2.7 RPG, 176 steals with a 1.4 SPG, .391 field goal percentage, .668 free-throw percentage, and .338 3-point percentage.

References

External links
 Baloncesto Superior Nacional de Puerto Rico – Estadísticas Jugador

Puerto Rican men's basketball players
1978 FIBA World Championship players
Baloncesto Superior Nacional players
Basketball players at the 2011 Pan American Games
Puerto Rico men's national basketball team players
Arkansas RimRockers players
Albuquerque Thunderbirds players
Caciques de Humacao players
1983 births
Living people
Leones de Ponce basketball players
Valparaiso Beacons men's basketball players
Sportspeople from Ponce, Puerto Rico
Pan American Games gold medalists for Puerto Rico
Pan American Games medalists in basketball
Central American and Caribbean Games bronze medalists for Puerto Rico
Competitors at the 2014 Central American and Caribbean Games
Point guards
Central American and Caribbean Games medalists in basketball
Medalists at the 2011 Pan American Games